Fiona MacDonald MBE (born 9 December 1974) is a Scottish curler and Olympic champion, born in Paisley. She received a gold medal at the 2002 Winter Olympics in Salt Lake City.

She was appointed Member of the Order of the British Empire (MBE) in the 2002 Birthday Honours.

References

External links
 

1974 births
Living people
Scottish female curlers
British female curlers
Olympic gold medallists for Great Britain
Olympic curlers of Great Britain
Olympic medalists in curling
Curlers at the 2002 Winter Olympics
Sportspeople from Paisley, Renfrewshire
Medalists at the 2002 Winter Olympics
Scottish Olympic medallists
Continental Cup of Curling participants
Members of the Order of the British Empire